Situated at 16 Rue Bonaparte in the 6th arrondissement of Paris, the Académie nationale de médecine (National Academy of Medicine) was created in 1820 by King Louis XVIII at the urging of baron Antoine Portal. At its inception, the institution was known as the Académie royale de médecine (or Royal Academy of Medicine). This academy was endowed with the legal status of two institutions which preceded it—the Académie royale de chirurgie (or Royal Academy of Surgery), which was created in 1731 and of the Société royale de médecine (or Royal Society of Medicine), which was created in 1776.

Background 
Academy members initially convened at the Paris Faculty of Medicine (or Faculté de Médecine de Paris). Four years later, the academy acquired its own headquarters, in the form of a mansion in the rue  where it was located until 1850. The office was then relocated to a vaulted hall of the Hospital of Charity on rue Saint Pierre.

Their current facility on Rue Bonaparte was designed by the French architect Justin Rochet, and was constructed between 1899 and 1902.

In addition to Medicine, the academy has also been known to concern itself with access thereto.

As of 2020, Maurice Tubiana is the president of the academy.

Renaming 
The institution name has been changed several times since its creation. The following provides a timeline for the various names taken on by the institution:
 Académie Royale de Médecine (1820–1851);
 Académie Impériale de Médecine (1852–1947);
 Académie Nationale de Médecine (1947–present).

Edict 
The edict of 1820 (formally known as Ordonnance de 1820) was signed by Louis XVIII. The edict issued the following missions to the Académie Royale de Médecine:

" This Academy is especially instituted to respond to all requests coming from the government on all subjects that may concern public health, and mainly on epidemics, diseases specific to a country, epizooties, diverse fields of legal medicine, propagation of antivariolic vaccination, appraisal of new and secret, internal as well as external, medications, natural or man-made mineral waters, etc..."

"The Academy will moreover take charge of the works of the Companie royale de médecine and the Académie Royale de chirurgie in all fields of study or research which can contribute to the improvement of the art of healing."

Consequently, all registers and papers belonging to the Companie royale de médecine and the Académie Royale de chirurgie and related to the tasks assigned to the Academies, will be transmitted as Archives to the new academy."

Notable members

See also
 Royal Commission on Animal Magnetism

References

External links 

 Official site
 Bulletin de l'Académie nationale de médecine in Gallica, the digital library of the BnF.

 
1820 establishments in France
Buildings and structures in the 6th arrondissement of Paris
Learned societies of France